Penzel may refer to:
 19022 Penzel, a main-belt asteroid, named after Edgar Penzel (born 1921) 
 Christian Friedrich Penzel (1737–1801), a German musician
 Corporal Kirchner (born Michael Penzel in 1957), an American wrestler
 Max Penzel (born 1977), a German cinematographer and director